Mors may refer to:

Mors (mythology), the personification of death in Roman mythology
Mors, Latin for death
Mors (automobile), a French car manufacturer from 1895 to 1925
American Mors, Mors vehicles produced under licence in America by the St Louis Car Co.
Mors (island) or Morsø, a Danish island
Mors or Moers, a town in Germany
Mors submachine gun, a World War II Polish weapon
Mors (drink), a Russian berry-based drink
MORS, an acronym for Military Operations Research Society
Major Harald Mors, a battalion commander with the German paratroopers
Captain Mors, the "Air Pirate", a fictional German hero from early in the 20th century